Rick's Café Casablanca is a restaurant, bar and café located in the city of Casablanca, Morocco. Opened March 1, 2004, the place was designed to recreate the bar made famous by Humphrey Bogart and Ingrid Bergman in the movie classic Casablanca. It is owned by The Usual Suspects company and is usually described as the real Rick's Café.

Architecture and décor

Rick's Café Casablanca was developed by Kathy Kriger (1946–2018), a former American diplomat and commercial attaché in Morocco. The restaurant is housed in a traditional Moroccan grand mansion with a central courtyard (riad), built in 1930. Two palm trees flank its front door, and the land placement allows for three facades: a distinctive streetfront entrance with heavy wooden doors that depict that of the film; a port-oriented façade that looks to the Atlantic; and a narrow dead-end access which was the former main entrance but is now the service entrance.

Due to the age of the structure and proximity to the sea, the mansion was completely restored and renovated. American architect and interior designer Bill Willis conceived the decorative and architectural details reminiscent of the film: curved arches, a sculpted bar, balconies, balustrades as well as beaded and stencilled brass lighting and plants that cast luminous shadows on white walls. There is an authentic 1930s Pleyel piano and As Time Goes By is a common request to the in-house pianist.

Rick's Café is also full of tile and wood work representing Morocco's craft industry. Fireplaces are of carved marble or painted tadelakt with intricate zellij tile patterns accenting the fireplaces and the risers of the central stairway. Tadelakt in muted colors cover walls throughout the restaurant, and the floors are set in hand made terra cotta tile.

Food

Food selections at Rick's Café takes advantage of Morocco's abundance in seafood. The menu offers a wide selection of fish from the traditional Sole meunière to John Dory crusted with black pepper, white wine and thyme. Steaks, foie gras, goat cheese salad with fresh figs and an American Crab Louie are among the dinner selections. Rick's Cheesecake and Brownies figure on the dessert menu, along with more exotic presentations highlighting local fresh fruit.

They also specialize in fromaged seafood.

Music

Issam Chabaa plays piano nightly Tuesday through Sunday, a repertoire of standards reminiscent of the 1940s and 1950s, including classic French, Spanish and Brazilian songs along with American favorites such as Summertime, The Lady is a Tramp, Blue Moon and the inevitable As Time Goes By (several times a night). Sunday night is programmed for a jam session where musicians passing through town, and local amateurs join Issam for jazz improvisation. Between sets and at lunch a soundtrack of compiled standards and big band sounds provides background music.

References

External links 

 Rick's Café Website

Further reading
 The New York Times. Travel Advisory A Casablanca Landmark Is Ready for Its Debut Feb 22, 2004
 Reuters. Gin joint of film fame lives on in Casablanca Feb 29, 2008
 ABC TV. Foreign Correspondent Postcard series 15 Episode 39
 Frommer's. Travel guide  Frommer's review June 16, 2008
 The Independent. Travel  48 Hours In - Casablanca, Morocco Saturday, 5 May 2007
 BBC NEWS. World News Tuesday, 20 July 2004
 Bloomberg.com Muse Arts. Review  Rick's Cafe Lures Bogart Fans With Steaks in Casablanca June 16, 2008

Film-themed restaurants
Buildings and structures in Casablanca
Tourist attractions in Casablanca
Casablanca (film)
Moroccan cuisine